The 1926 Rhode Island gubernatorial election was held on November 2, 1926. Incumbent Republican Aram J. Pothier defeated Democratic nominee Joseph H. Gainer with 53.90% of the vote.

General election

Candidates
Major party candidates
Aram J. Pothier, Republican
Joseph H. Gainer, Democratic

Other candidates
Peter McDermott, Socialist Labor

Results

References

1926
Rhode Island